Fencing competitions at the 2022 South American Games in Asuncion, Paraguay were held between October 2 and 7, 2022 at the Federación Paraguaya de Tenis de Mesa.

Schedule
The competition schedule is as follows:

Medal summary

Medal table

Medalists

Men

Women

Participation
Eleven nations participated in fencing events of the 2022 South American Games.

References

Fencing
South American Games
2022